Bruce Earl Fairbairn (December 30, 1949 – May 17, 1999) was a Canadian record producer. He was active as a producer from 1976 to 1999, and is considered one of the best of his era. His most successful productions are Slippery When Wet and New Jersey by Bon Jovi, Permanent Vacation, Pump, and Get a Grip by Aerosmith, The Razors Edge by AC/DC, and Balance by Van Halen, each of which sold at least three million copies. He was originally a trumpet player, then started a career as a record producer for Canadian rock band Prism. Fairbairn won the Canadian music industry Producer of the Year Juno Award three times. He produced albums for many well-known international artists such as Loverboy, Blue Öyster Cult, Bon Jovi, Poison, Aerosmith, AC/DC, Scorpions, Van Halen, Chicago, The Cranberries, INXS, Kiss and Yes. His style was notable for introducing dynamic horn arrangements into rock music productions. Fairbairn died suddenly on May 17, 1999, due to unknown causes.

Career

Early life and Prism
Fairbairn played the trumpet since the age of 5, as well as studying piano. Until the age of 16, he was a trumpetist in community groups. While in the 10th grade at Vancouver's Prince of Wales Secondary School, Fairbairn founded his first band The Spectres, managed by Bruce Allen, who would remain with Fairbairn through his career.

In the early 1970s, Fairbairn started producing while he was part of the Vancouver jazz-rock group Sunshyne, in which he played both trumpet and horn. There he met bandmate Jim Vallance, who would go on to become one of the most successful songwriters in the music industry and an important music associate. After Vallance left Sunshyne in 1973, Fairbairn changed Sunshyne's format to blues-rock-pop. Fairbairn recruited guitarist Lindsay Mitchell, from Vancouver band Seeds of Time, as singer-songwriter and frontman. Fairbairn worked through 1974 to land a recording contract for Sunshyne, using demos of two songs written by Mitchell. By mid-1975, when Fairbairn could not close a record deal for Sunshyne, he approached Vallance for assistance. Vallance reworked the arrangements on the Mitchell songs and supplied three of his own at Fairbairn's request. One of the Vallance songs, "Open Soul Surgery" impressed an executive at record label GRT, who signed Fairbairn's group to a recording contract in 1976.

Over the next year, Fairbairn produced an album using musicians from both Sunshyne and Seeds of Time (including himself). The newly renamed band Prism released its debut album in 1977. The album reached platinum status in Canada, with sales in excess of 100,000 albums by 1978.1 Fairbairn himself, however, elected not to be a member of Prism, and is credited only as producer and as a session musician on the album, and he did not play with Prism in any live performances.
 
Fairbairn produced Prism's next three albums, all of which went platinum or double platinum in Canada. In 1980, Fairbairn won his first of three Canadian music industry Producer of the Year Juno Awards for Prism's third album, Armageddon.

Loverboy
In 1980, while still working with Prism, Fairbairn started production work on the debut album for Canadian rock band Loverboy. The self-titled album Loverboy would be the first Fairbairn production to break through in the lucrative US market and launch Fairbairn's international success.

Fairbairn's productions attracted a growing list of international artists to Vancouver's Little Mountain Sound Studios to work with him and his protégé Bob Rock. Over the next 5 years, Fairbairn's work on Blue Öyster Cult's 1983 album The Revölution by Night, Krokus' 1984 album The Blitz, and Canadian band Honeymoon Suite's arena rock 1985 album The Big Prize continued Fairbairn's string of international hits.

Slippery When Wet
Fairbairn's biggest commercial success is Bon Jovi's Slippery When Wet (1986), which made him a top-rate international producer. The album has sold over 28 million copies worldwide. "Bruce Fairbairn was a trumpet player," noted Jon Bon Jovi in 2007. "You couldn't get him on a guitar. And, for the first time, we were allowed to be us in the studio."

"I've been lucky enough to work with so many different talents," Fairbairn noted, "but Bon Jovi may be the finest.  There was record company pressure to deliver the hits, but they were a joy. People seem to concentrate so much on their success that they lose sight of how good these guys are."

Permanent Vacation
His next major production, Aerosmith's 1987 album Permanent Vacation, was another international success and generated a series of hits including "Dude (Looks Like a Lady)", "Angel", and "Rag Doll". Steven Tyler said that Fairbairn was instrumental in the creation of the album and "helped relight the fire under Aerosmith".

Continued international success
In 1988, Fairbairn produced the Bon Jovi album New Jersey, which holds the record for the hard rock/glam metal album to spawn the most Top 10 singles, with five singles charting in the Top 10 of the Billboard Hot 100, selling over seven million copies in the United States. Fairbain also produced Aerosmith's follow-up, 1989's Pump, which had sales in excess of seven million and was widely acclaimed by critics, and won him another "Producer of the Year" Juno Award.

In the 1990s, Fairbairn worked with a string of internationally influential hard rock acts. In 1990 he produced AC/DC's The Razors Edge, and Poison's Flesh and Blood. In 1993, he produced another Aerosmith commercial hit, Get a Grip, which racked up sales of seven million and solidified the band's growing representation as international media stars. Next, Fairbairn produced Scorpions' Face the Heat and in 1995 Van Halen's Balance. Also in 1995, Fairbairn went to Vallance's Armoury Studios in Vancouver to work on Chicago's Night and Day: Big Band, and liked the studio so much he bought it from Vallance the following year.

In late 1996, and through early 1997, Fairbairn produced INXS' 'comeback' album Elegantly Wasted which, while garnering mixed reviews, obtained sales that were higher than INXS' previous albums. Also, Fairbairn produced The Cranberries' To the Faithful Departed, and Kiss' reunion-album Psycho Circus.

His last fully completed project was the Atomic Fireballs' Torch This Place for Atlantic Records in 1998, which Fairbairn described as "a return to my brass roots".

Death and legacy
During the mixing sessions for Yes' The Ladder, on May 17, 1999, Fairbairn was found dead by Yes singer Jon Anderson and Armoury manager Sheryl Preston in his Vancouver home. He was survived by his wife, Julie, with whom he had three sons: Scott, Kevin, and Brent. Bob Rock explained that, on the week Fairbairn died, the two were to travel to New York to meet Bon Jovi for another album together.

A memorial, "A Celebration of the Life of Bruce Earl Fairbairn", held at the Vancouver Chan Centre, was attended by more than 300 people. Highlighted by reminiscences from close friends, the event included musical performances from Jon Anderson and Steve Howe performing the song "Nine Voices" from Yes' The Ladder sessions, as well as Tom Keenlyside, guitarist David Sinclair and finally, "Taps" played on Bruce's trumpet by son Brent.

In March 2000, Fairbairn was posthumously awarded the Canadian Music Hall of Fame Juno Award for his work.

In his interviews concerning The Ladder, Fairbairn can be seen in short sections in the bonus material on Yes' Live at the House of Blues DVD.

Production discography
1977: Prism - Prism 
1978: Prism - See Forever Eyes
1978: Prism - Live Tonite
1979: Prism - Armageddon
1979: Ian Lloyd - Goose Bumps
1980: Prism - Young and Restless
1980: Loverboy - Loverboy
1980: The Skids - Days in Europa (Second Version)
1980: Ian Lloyd - 3WC
1981: Loverboy - Get Lucky 
1982: Strange Advance - Worlds Away
1982: Kasim Sulton - Kasim
1983: Blue Öyster Cult - The Revölution by Night
1983: Loverboy - Keep It Up 
1984: Krokus - The Blitz 
1984: Fast Forward - Living in Fiction
1985: Black n' Blue - Without Love
1985: Honeymoon Suite - The Big Prize
1986: Bon Jovi - Slippery When Wet
1987: Aerosmith - Permanent Vacation 
1987: Rock and Hyde - Under the Volcano
1987: Loverboy - Wildside 
1988: Dan Reed Network - Dan Reed Network
1988: Bon Jovi - New Jersey
1989: Aerosmith - Pump 
1989: Stairway to Heaven/Highway to Hell
1989: Gorky Park - Gorky Park
1990: AC/DC - The Razors Edge 
1990: Paul Laine - Stick It in Your Ear
1990: Poison - Flesh & Blood
1991: Dan Reed Network - The Heat
1991: AC/DC - Live
1993: Aerosmith - Get a Grip 
1993: Scorpions - Face the Heat
1994: Jackyl - Push Comes to Shove 
1995: Van Halen - Balance
1995: Chicago - Night & Day: Big Band
1996: The Cranberries - To the Faithful Departed 
1997: INXS - Elegantly Wasted
1997: Noise Therapy - Cyclops
1998: Kiss - Psycho Circus 
1998: Atomic Fireballs - Torch This Place
1999: Yes - The Ladder

See also

Music of Canada
Canadian Music Hall of Fame

References

1949 births
1999 deaths
Canadian audio engineers
Canadian record producers
Jack Richardson Producer of the Year Award winners
Musicians from Vancouver
20th-century American musicians
20th-century Canadian male musicians
Canadian Music Hall of Fame inductees